Yishun Town Secondary School (YTSS) is a co-educational government autonomous secondary school in Yishun, Singapore.

History
The school was first established in 1986, originally sharing its premises with Yishun Secondary School and Yishun Junior College. In 1988, the school moved into a new S$8.1 million campus along Yishun Street 21.

Relation with other schools
Yishun Town Secondary School, Nan Chiau High School and Xinmin Secondary School had been holding combined sports meets annually since 2013 to give student athletes from the participating schools a platform to showcase their physical talent and also for the schools to unite to celebrate and enjoy. Apart from the inter-school competitions among students, parent-teacher races are also featured to engage the parents and school staff. This yearly event was stopped in 2017 due to unknown reasons.

Notable alumni
 Kelly Poon: Mandopop singer; Female winner, Project SuperStar, MediaCorp TV Channel U
 Hazlina Halim: News reader, MediaCorp Suria; Deejay, Ria 89.7 FM

Gallery

References

External links
Official website

Educational institutions established in 1986
1986 establishments in Singapore
Autonomous schools in Singapore
Secondary schools in Singapore
Schools in Yishun
Yishun